Strunk is an unincorporated community and coal town in McCreary County, Kentucky, United States. The community's post office was established as Strunks Lane on February 18, 1892, and was probably named for George W. Strunk, who owned a local coal mine. By 1894, the post office's  name was simplified to Strunk. Its ZIP code is 42649.

Notable people
Master Sergeant Wilburn K. Ross, Medal of Honor Recipient for his service during World War II

References

Unincorporated communities in McCreary County, Kentucky
Unincorporated communities in Kentucky
Coal towns in Kentucky